St Mary's is a Gaelic Athletic Association club based in Saggart, County Dublin, Ireland. Mary's have won the Dublin Senior Football Championship on one occasion in 1921. Since then they had been relegated to the Dublin Intermediate Football Championship and regained their senior status in 1976 and have remained a Senior club ever since. St Mary's currently play in the Dublin AFL Division 2.

Five St Mary's players were on the Dublin team which won the 1942 All Ireland Final against Galway. The five players were Paddy Bermingham, Gerry Fitzgerald, Peter O'Reilly, Caleb Crone and Paddy O'Connor. Caleb Crone also won an All-Ireland medal with Cork in 1945.

Roll of honour
 Dublin Senior Football Championship: Winners 1921
 Dublin Intermediate Football Championship: Winners 1976
 Dublin Junior Football Championship: Winners 2002
 Dublin Senior Football League Division 1 Winners 2004
 Dublin AFL Division 2: Winners 2000
 Dublin AFL Division 3: Winners 2021, 2022

Notable players
 Caleb Crone

References

External links
Official St Mary's GAA Website
Club History

Gaelic games clubs in South Dublin (county)
Gaelic football clubs in South Dublin (county)
Saggart